Herbert Collum (18 July 1914 − 29 April 1982) was a German organist, harpsichordist, composer and conductor.

Life 
Born in Leipzig, Collum received high school education between 1921 and 1929. He continued from 1930 to 1934 at the Church Music Institute in Leipzig, where he studied organ with Karl Straube and Günther Ramin, piano with Carl Adolf Martienssen, choral conducting with Kurt Thomas, and musical composition with Johann Nepomuk David and Fritz Reuter. Already by 1927 he had become deputy organist at the St. Matthäikirche Leipzig. From 1932 to 1935 he served as assistant to Ramin, Thomaskantor at the Thomaskirche. His appointment in 1935 as principal organist, "Kreuzorganist", at the Kreuzkirche in Dresden signalled the beginning of his creative period; he remained in that post until his death in April 1982 at the age of 67. His successor as Kreuzorganiste was Michael-Christfried Winkler.

At the end of World War II, Collum founded his own choir in 1946, with a dedicated set of concerts. To mark the 200th anniversary of J S Bach's death, he organised 24 concerts between September 1949 and August 1950, featuring the Collum Choir and members of the Staatskapelle Dresden. The performances took place at the Martin Luther Church in the Neustadt and the Reformed Church, because the Kreuzkirche had been damaged by fire after bombing in 1945.

As Kreuzorganist, Collum also took on various teaching roles. From 1942 to 1945 and again between 1954 and 1956, he was a lecturer at the Dresden Conservatory, teaching organ there from 1956 to 1958. He also taught organ at the Spandauer Kirchenmusikschule from 1949 to 1961, with a professorship in 1960. He began reaching harpsichord at the Musikhochschule Dresden in 1964, the same year as his appointment to the jury of the International Johann Sebastian Bach Competition.

In 1942 he married the singer and teacher Herta Maria Böhme-Collum. After one year  was born: following in the footsteps of his parents, he became an organist and church musician.

Collum was buried according to his last wishes in Reinhardtsgrimma. He frequently gave concerts on the Silbermann organ in the village church and made a recording in the series "Bach on Silbermann Organs". The concert tradition founded by him has successfully been continued under the direction of the current Kreuzorganist Holger Gehring, resulting in the organ becoming one of the best known in Saxony.

Honours and legacy 
In 1973 Collum received the Art Prize of the German Democratic Republic. In Dresden, the Herbert-Collum-Straße was later named after him. The archives of Herbert Collum are kept in the Saxon State and University Library Dresden.

Compositions

Orchestral music 
 Symphony No. 1, 1939
 Symphony No. 2, 1940
 Concerto for flute and chamber orchestra, 1944
 Concerto in C major for orchestra, first performance on July 1, 1953 by the Dresden Philharmonic Orchestra, conducted by Franz Jung
 Concerto in E for String Orchestra, premiere on 28 May 1955 by the Staatskapelle Dresden, conducted by Franz Konwitschny
 Concertante music no. 1, 1961
 Concertante music no. 2, 1964
 Moritzburg Concerto No. 1, 1965
 Moritzburg Concerto No. 2, 1968
 5 concertos for harpsichord and chamber orchestra
 Sinfonietta for chamber orchestra, 1974

Organ works 
 Totentanz - Variations on an old folk song: "It is a reaper, is called death", 1944
 Organ book of the Dresden Kreuzkirche, 1950
 Suite, 1952
 Organ Suite, 1962
 Toccata, 1964
 Leksand Suite, 1966
 Fantasia, 1969
 Siljan Suite, 1970
 Metamorphosis, 1970
 Fantasy about Bells of the Cross Church (EGAHD), 1973
 Concerto for Organ and Orchestra, 1975 - premiere April 10–12, 1975 by the Dresden Philharmonic, conductor: Hartmut Haenchen
 Fantasy - Triptych, 1975
 2 concertos for organ and vibraphone, 1978
 "Media in vita" for vibraphone and organ - premiere on 11 June 1979 at the Kreuzkirche Dresden

Chamber music 
 Suite for piano, 1945
 Sonata for flute and piano, 1954
 New piano pieces (223 movements), 1960–1962

Vocal music 
 3 Christmas carols, 1943
 St. John Passion, 1953
 How the city lies so desolate, 1956
 For we have no permanent town here, 1959
 Te Deum, 1959
 Great Psalter, 1961
 German Magnificat, 1962
 Fantasy about b-a-c-h, 1964
 Spiritual motets and chants

Theatre music 
  The Prince of Homburg (Heinrich von Kleist), incidental music conducted by Fritz Wendel, Staatsschauspiel Dresden, 1955

Recordings 

 Metamorphose für Orgel. (1970)
 Kleine Messe für Positiv.
 Totentanz : Variationen über ein altes Volkslied für Orgel "Es ist ein Schnitter, heißt der Tod".<ref>[https://www.worldcat.org/oclc/248197145 Totentanz : Variationen über ein altes Volkslied für Orgel "Es ist ein Schnitter, heißt der Tod"] on WorldCat</ref> (1979)
 Christum wir sollen loben : Weihnachts-Motette; kleine Choral-Partita für gemischten Chor a cappella.
 Bach: Französische Suiten (1–6)
 Bach: Das Orgelwerk auf Silbermann-Orgeln
 List of 71 Compositions by Collum in the German National Library.

Notes

References 
 Gojowy, Detlef: "Suche nach Identität" – Kreuzorganist Herbert Collum. in Die Dresdner Kirchenmusik im 19. und 20. Jahrhundert, edited by Matthias Herrmann, Laaber 1998,  (Musik in Dresden 3),

External links 
 
 
Archives of Herbert Collum, Saxon State and University Library Dresden
 Dieter Härtwig: Collum, Herbert. In Institut für Sächsische Geschichte und Volkskunde (ed.): Sächsische Biografie.

1914 births
1982 deaths
Musicians from Leipzig
German classical organists
German harpsichordists
20th-century classical composers
20th-century German composers
Recipients of the National Prize of East Germany